Fray Pedro de los Ríos (died 1563–1565) was a Domician missionary in New Spain in the mid-16th century. Little is known about him, but he contributed to the creation of the manuscripts now known as the Codex Telleriano-Remensis and Codex Vaticanus A, which describe Aztec culture and history. The Codex Vaticanus A is also known as the Codex Ríos, after Pedro de los Ríos.

See also
Codex Ríos
Codex Telleriano-Remensis

Notes

References

 
 
 

16th-century deaths
Roman Catholic missionaries in New Spain
Novohispanic Mesoamericanists
Historians of Mesoamerica
16th-century Mesoamericanists
16th-century Mexican historians
Year of birth unknown
Dominican missionaries